Breukelen is a railway station located in Breukelen, Netherlands. The station was opened on 18 December 1843 and is on the Amsterdam–Arnhem railway. It is also the northern end of the Harmelen–Breukelen railway. A new station was opened in 2002 nearer the A2 motorway and further from the town. For this the junction with the line to Harmelen and Woerden also moved.

Train services
The following services currently call at Breukelen:
2x per hour local service (sprinter) Uitgeest - Amsterdam - Woerden - Rotterdam
2x per hour local service (sprinter) (Amsterdam -) Breukelen - Utrecht - Rhenen (Amsterdam only during peak hours)
2x per hour local service (sprinter) Breukelen - Utrecht - Veenendaal Centrum

External links
NS website 
Dutch Public Transport journey planner 

Railway stations in the Netherlands opened in 1843
Railway stations in Utrecht (province)
Railway stations on the Rhijnspoorweg
1843 establishments in the Netherlands
Buildings and structures in Stichtse Vecht
19th-century architecture in the Netherlands